Romance on the Range is a 1955 Patti Page 12" LP, issued by Mercury Records as catalog number MG-20076.  It collected recordings from a previous folk album and various singles.

Track listing

References

Patti Page albums
Mercury Records albums
1955 albums